Cawdor (Roman Fort), located near the small village of Easter Galcantray ( east of Inverness), is suspected of being one of the northernmost Roman forts in Great Britain, though this is controversial.

Discovery

In 1984, the site of a possible Roman fort was identified at Easter Galcantray, south west of Cawdor, by aerial photography.

The site was excavated between 1985 and 1990 and, although no Roman pottery or artefacts were found, several features were identified that seemed supportive of this classification:

If confirmed, it would be the most northerly known Roman fort in the British Isles. The possibility that Agricola reached this far north is also suggested by discoveries at Portmahomack and Tarradale on the northern shores of the Beauly Firth, but Romano-British scholars have been reticent in confirming Jones' interpretation of the site.

More research required

In mid-83 CE Agricola defeated the armies of the Caledonians, led by Calgacus, at the Battle of Mons Graupius. With victory, Agricola extracted hostages from the Caledonian tribes and instructed his fleet to sail around the north coast confirming to the Romans the province of Britannia was an island.
Agricola then may have marched his army to the northern coast of Britain, and reached the Inverness area, near the Easter Galcantray (Cawdor) Fort. In 1985, a "small piece of Roman coarse ware" was found with burnt material at the bottom of a ditch at the site but studies of the pottery identified it as medieval.

Radiocarbon tests of material recovered from the site gave possible dates of construction during Agricola's first century campaign, but its interpretation remains problematic because the site was occupied and abandoned quite quickly leaving no other evidence. There has been no academic consensus over two centuries regarding the location for the battle of Mons Graupius. For example, William Roy (1793), Gabriel Jacques Surenne (1823), Archibald Watt and C. Michael Hogan believe it was fought further south on the coast near the Roman camps of Raedykes or Glenmailen. Whereas Vittorio di Martino (author of "Roman Ireland", about a possible Roman expedition to Ireland) believes the Roman victory happened in an area southwest of Cawdor.

See also

Scotland during the Roman Empire
Inchtuthill
Deers Den
Normandykes

Notes

Bibliography

External links
 MHG6892 - Enclosure (Roman?) Holme Rose
   Excavations of Jones and Daniels
  RCAHMS: Cawdor Roman Fort excavations at Easter Galcantray
 The Roman Gask Project
 Temporary Marching Camp: Normandykes, Peterculter, Grampian (2004)
 Britannia - The Roman army and navy in Britain (55BC - 410AD)

Archaeological sites in Highland (council area)
Archaeological sites in Scotland
Roman legionary fortresses in Scotland